Gbingue is a town in the Iolonioro Department of Bougouriba Province in south-western Burkina Faso. As of 2005, the town had an estimated population of 2,127.

References

Populated places in the Sud-Ouest Region (Burkina Faso)
Bougouriba Province